Carol Guzy (born March 7, 1956) is an American news photographer. Guzy worked as a staff photographer for the Miami Herald from 1980 to 1988 and The Washington Post from 1988 to 2014. As of April 2022, Guzy is a contract photographer for ZUMA Press.

She won the Pulitzer Prize four times — one of five people to do so, and the first journalist with that achievement. Guzy was awarded a Pulitzer Prize in 1986, 1995, 2000 and 2011.

Life and career
Guzy was born into a working-class family in Bethlehem, Pennsylvania, where she grew up.

She graduated with an associate degree in nursing from Northampton Community College in 1977, and planned to work as a nurse until a friend gave her a camera. In 1980, she earned an associate degree in applied science in photography from the Art Institute of Fort Lauderdale, Florida. 
Afterward she became an intern, and then a photographer, at The Miami Herald. She married UPI photographer Jonathan Utz in 1988. That year she also moved to The Washington Post, following her husband to a job in the city. They divorced in 1998.

In 1990, Guzy was the first woman to receive the Newspaper Photographer of the Year Award, presented by the National Press Photographers Association.

She was detained by police and arrested on April 15, 2000 as a part of the IMF World Bank detentions. 
In 2001, she was awarded the Northampton Community College Alumni Association's Professional Achievement Award. Upon receiving it, Guzy said, 

Besides her work in The Washington Post, Guzy's work has appeared on the Photography Channel.

In August 2007, Guzy's photos of animals left behind on the Gulf Coast, where she spent months in the aftermath of Hurricane Katrina, were included in a three-artist benefit exhibit titled "Lest We Forget: Three Perspectives on Hurricane Katrina" at the Discovery Too art gallery in Bethesda, Maryland.

Guzy lives in Arlington, Virginia.

Pulitzer Prizes 
Guzy is one of only five people to win the Pulitzer Prize four times.

 Guzy won her first Pulitzer Prize in 1986. 
 Guzy won her second Pulitzer in 1995 for her photographs on the Haitian crisis.
 Guzy's third prize was awarded in 2000 for her work in Kosovo.
 Guzy's fourth and final Pulitzer Prize was awarded to her in 2011, again for her work in Haiti, this time covering the 2010 Haiti earthquake and its aftermath.

Awards
 1986 Pulitzer Prize for Spot News Photography, Guzy and Michel Ducille, The Miami Herald
 1995 Pulitzer Prize for Spot News Photography, Guzy, The Washington Post
 2000 Pulitzer Prize for Feature Photography, Guzy, Michael Williamson and Lucian Perkins, The Washington Post
 1990; 1993; 1997 Photographer of the Year awards in the National Press Photographers' annual contest
 2009 Best of Photojournalism, Enterprise Picture Story, National Press Photographers Association
 2009 Robert F. Kennedy Journalism Award (International Photo)
 2009 The Hillman Prize, Photo-journalism
 2011 Pulitzer Prize for Breaking News Photography, Guzy, Nikki Kahn and Ricky Carioti, The Washington Post
 2012 Photographer of the Year, Photo Imaging Manufacturers and Distributors Association (PMDA) annual awards
2013 Missouri Honor Medal for Distinguished Service in Journalism "In recognition of her creative and principled use of the camera in pursuit of compassion and social justice"
2018 Robert Capa Gold Medal Award for her reportage about the effects of the war against ISIS on the civilian population of Mosul 
2019 Al Neuharth Award for Excellence in the Media presented by the Newseum (Washington, D.C.)
2021 White House News Photographers Association Lifetime Achievement Award presented in Washington, D.C.

Selected works
"1997 Picture of the Year", The Washington Post
"1st Place, Enterprise Picture Story (large markets)", Best of Photojournalism
"Tapestry of Life: Essay and Photos by Carol Guzy", Poynter Online, Feb. 23, 2000

References

External links
"Interview with Carol Guzy," January 2002 

C-SPAN Q&A interview with Guzy, May 1, 2011

1956 births
Living people
American photojournalists
Pulitzer Prize for Feature Photography winners
Pulitzer Prize for Photography winners 
The Washington Post people
Miami Herald people
People from Bethlehem, Pennsylvania
Photographers from Pennsylvania
Journalists from Washington, D.C.
American women photographers
American women journalists
Journalists from Pennsylvania
21st-century American women
Women photojournalists